The Book of Nahum is the seventh book of the 12 minor prophets of the Hebrew Bible. It is attributed to the prophet Nahum, and was probably written in Jerusalem in the 7th century BC.

Background 
Josephus places Nahum during the reign of Jotham, while others place him in the beginning of the reign of Ahaz, Judah's next king, or even the latter half of the reign of Hezekiah, Ahaz's son; all three accounts date the book to the 8th century BC. The book would then have been written in Jerusalem, where Nahum would have witnessed the invasion of Sennacherib and his retreat.

The scholarly consensus is that the "book of vision" was written at the time of the fall of Nineveh at the hands of the Medes and Babylonians in 612 BC. This theory is demonstrated by the fact that the oracles must be dated after the Assyrian destruction of Thebes, Egypt in 663 BC, as this event is mentioned in Nahum 3:8.

Author 

Little is known about Nahum's personal history. His name means "comforter", and he was from the town of Elkosh or Alqosh (Nahum 1:1), which scholars have attempted to identify with several cities, including the modern `Alqush of Assyria and Capernaum of northern Galilee. He was a very nationalistic Hebrew, and lived amongst the Elkoshites in peace. His writings were likely written in about 615 BC, before the downfall of Assyria.

Historical context 

The subject of Nahum's prophecy is the approaching complete and final destruction of Nineveh, the capital of the great and at that time flourishing Assyrian empire. Ashurbanipal was at the height of his glory. Nineveh was a city of vast extent, and was then the center of the civilization and commerce of the world, according to Nahum a "bloody city all full of lies and robbery", a reference to the Neo-Assyrian Empire's military campaigns and demand of tribute and plunder from conquered cities.

Jonah had already uttered his message of warning, and Nahum was followed by Zephaniah, who also predicted the destruction of the city.

Nineveh was destroyed apparently by fire around 625 BC, and the Assyrian empire came to an end, an event which changed the face of Asia. Archaeological digs have uncovered the splendor of Nineveh in its zenith under Sennacherib (705–681 BC), Esarhaddon (681–669 BC), and Ashurbanipal (669–633 BC). Massive walls were eight miles in circumference. It had a water aqueduct, palaces and a library with 20,000 clay tablets, including accounts of a creation in Enuma Elish and a flood in the Epic of Gilgamesh.

The Babylonian chronicle of the fall of Nineveh tells the story of the end of Nineveh. Nabopolassar of Babylon joined forces with Cyaxares, king of the Medes, and laid siege for three months.

Assyria lasted a few more years after the loss of its fortress, but attempts by Egyptian Pharaoh Necho II to rally the Assyrians failed due to opposition from king Josiah of Judah, and it seemed to be all over by 609 BC.

Overview 

The Book of Nahum consists of two parts: a prelude in chapter one, followed by chapters two and three which describe the fall of Nineveh, which later took place in 612 BC. Nineveh is compared to Thebes, the Egyptian city that Assyria itself had destroyed in 663 BC. Nahum describes the siege and frenzied activity of Nineveh's troops as they try in vain to halt the invaders. Poetically, he becomes a participant in the battle, and with subtle irony, barks battle commands to the defenders. Nahum uses numerous similes and metaphor that Nineveh will become weak "like the lion hiding in its den". It concludes with a taunt song and funeral dirge of the impending destruction of Nineveh and the "sleep" or death of the Assyrian people and demise of the once great Assyrian conqueror-rulers.

Surviving early manuscripts 
The original text was written in Biblical Hebrew.

Some early manuscripts containing the text of this chapter in Hebrew are of the Masoretic Text, which includes the Codex Cairensis (895), Aleppo Codex (10th century), and Codex Leningradensis (1008).

Fragments of this book were found among the Dead Sea Scrolls including 4QpNah, known as the "Nahum Commentary" (1st century BCE); 4Q82 (4QXIIg; 1st century BCE). and Wadi Murabba'at MurXII (1st century CE).

There is also a translation into Koine Greek known as the Septuagint, made in the last few centuries BC, with extant manuscripts including Codex Vaticanus (B; B; 4th century), Codex Sinaiticus (S; BHK: S; 4th century), Codex Alexandrinus (A; A; 5th century) and Codex Marchalianus (Q; Q; 6th century). Some fragments containing parts of this chapter (a revision of the Septuagint) were found among the Dead Sea Scrolls, i.e., Naḥal Ḥever (8ḤevXIIgr; 1st century CE).

Themes

The fall of Nineveh 

Nahum's prophecy carries a particular warning to the Ninevites of coming events, although he is partly in favor of the destruction. One might even say that the book of Nahum is "a celebration of the fall of Assyria." And this is not just a warning or speaking positively of the destruction of Nineveh, it is also a positive encouragement and "message of comfort for Israel, Judah, and others who had experienced the "endless cruelty" of the Assyrians."

The prophet Jonah shows us where God shows concern for the people of Nineveh, while Nahum's writing testifies to his belief in the righteousness/justice of God and how God dealt with those Assyrians in punishment according to "their cruelty". The Assyrians had been used as God's "rod of […] anger, and the staff in their hand [as] indignation."

The nature of God 
From its opening, Nahum shows God to be slow to anger, but that God will by no means ignore the guilty; God will bring his vengeance and wrath to pass. God is presented as a God who will punish evil, but will protect those who trust in Him. The opening passage states: "God is jealous, and the LORD revengeth; the LORD revengeth, and is furious; the LORD will take vengeance on his adversaries, and he reserveth wrath for his enemies. The LORD is slow to anger, and great in power, and will not at all acquit the wicked".

"The LORD is slow to anger and Quick to love; the LORD will not leave the guilty unpunished."

"The LORD is good, a refuge in times of trouble. He cares for those who trust in him"

Importance 
God's judgement on Nineveh is "all because of the wanton lust of a harlot, alluring, the mistress of sorceries, who enslaved nations by her prostitution and peoples by her witchcraft." Infidelity, according to the prophets, related to spiritual unfaithfulness. For example: "the land is guilty of the vilest adultery in departing from the LORD." John of Patmos used a similar analogy in Revelation chapter 17.

The prophecy of Nahum was referenced in the deuterocanonical Book of Tobit. In Tobit 14:4 (NRSV) a dying Tobit says to his son Tobias and Tobias' sons:
[My son] hurry off to Media, for I believe the word of God that Nahum spoke about Nineveh, that all these things will take place and overtake Assyria and Nineveh. Indeed, everything that was spoken by the prophets of Israel, whom God sent, will occur. 
However, some versions, such as the King James Version, refer to the prophet Jonah instead.

See also

References

Sources

External links 

 Unique Pictures Of Nahum Tomb By Kobi Arami
 Jewish translations:
 Nachum – Nahum (Judaica Press) translation [with Rashi's commentary] at Chabad.org
 Christian translations:
 Online Bible at GospelHall.org (ESV, KJV, Darby, American Standard Version, Bible in Basic English)
 BibleGateway
 Nahum – King James Version
  Various versions

Commentary
 This article also contains a section on the Book of Nahum.

 
7th-century BC books
Twelve Minor Prophets